Here is a list of all Turkish makams of Ottoman classical music.

A 
1. Âb-ı Kevser

2. Acem

3. Acem-Aşîrân

4. Acem-Bâ-Zir-Keşîde

5. Acem-Bûselik

6. Acem-Irak
 
7. Acem-Kürdî
 
8. Acem-Murassa
 
9. Acem-Rast
 
10. Acem-Zemzeme
 
11. Acem-Zir-Keşîde
 
12. Acemli Rast

12.5. Acemli Yegâh
 
13. Âgâaze-i Kâbili
 
14. Aheng-i-Tarâb
 
15. Akberi
 
16. Anber-Efşân
 
17. Arabân
 
18. Arabân-Kürdî
 
19. Arabân-Nigâr
 
20. Arabân-ı-Cedîd
 
21. Arazbâr
 
22. Arazbâr-Bûselik
 
23. Arazbâr-Zemzeme
 
24. Âvâz-ı Zenbûr
 
25. Azrâ
 
26. Aşîrân
 
27. Aşîrân-Mâye
 
28. Aşîrân-Vefâdar
 
29. Aşîrân-Zemzeme
 
30. Aşk-Efzâ

B 
 
31. Bâd-ı-Sabâ

32. Bahâr
 
33. Bahr-i-Nâzik

34. Bayâti
 
35. Bayâti-Arabân
 
36. Bayâti-Arabân-Bûselik
 
37. Bayâti-Aşîrân
 
38. Bayâti-Bûselik
 
39. Bayâti-Hisâr
 
40. Bayâti-Isfahân
 
41. Bayâti-Kürdî
 
42. Bend-i-Bûselik
 
43. Bend-i-Hisâr
 
44. Beste-Hisâr
 
45. Beste-Isfahân
 
46. Beste-Nigâr
 
47. Beste-Nigâr-Hisarek
 
48. Beste-Nigâr-ı-Atîyk
 
49. Beste-Nigâr-ı-Kadîm
 
50. Beynel-Bahreyn
 
51. Beyzâ
 
52. Bezm-i Tarâb
 
53. Bezmâra
 
54. Buhârî
 
55. Bûselik
 
56. Bûselik-Aşîrân
 
57. Bûselik-Gerdâniye
 
58. Bûselik-Geveyşt
 
59. Bûselik-Mâye
 
60. Bûselik-Nevrûz
 
61. Bûselik-Selmek
 
62. Bûselik-Şehnaz
 
63. Bûstan
 
64. Büzürk
 
65. Büzürk-Gerdâniye
 
66. Büzürk-Geveyşt
 
67. Büzürk-Mâye
 
68. Büzürk-Nevrûz
 
69. Büzürk-Selmek
 
70. Büzürk-Şehnâz

C 

71. Canfezâ
 
72. Çârgâh
 
73. Çârgâh-Âcem
 
74. Çârgâh-Gerdâniye
 
75. Çârgâh-Mahûr
 
76. Çehâr-Âgâazin

D 

77. Daği-Bayâti
 
78. Danişverân
 
79. Dil Âvîz
 
80. Dil-Ârâ
 
81. Dil-Efruz
 
82. Dil-Keşîde
 
83. Dil-Nişîn
 
84. Dil-Rübâ
 
85. Dil-Sûz
 
86. Dildâr
 
87. Dilkeş-Hâverân
 
88. Dilküşâ
 
89. Dost-Gahî
 
90. Dügâh
 
91. Dügâh-Bûselik

92. Dügâh-Mâye
 
93. Dügâh-ı Acem
 
94. Dügâh-ı Kadîm

E 
 
95. Ebû-Selik
 
96. Efrûhiten
 
97. Evcârâ
 
98. Evc (Eviç)
 
99. Evc-Aşirân
 
100. Evc-Bûselik
 
101. Evc-Gerdâniye
 
102. Evc-i Muhâlif
 
103. Evc-Isfahân
 
104. Evc-Maklüb
 
105. Evc-Mâye
 
106. Evc-Nihâvendi

F 
 
107. Ferâh
 
108. Ferâh-Âver
 
109. Ferâh-Zâyi
 
110. Ferâhfezâ
 
111. Ferâhnâk
 
112. Ferâhnümâ
 
113. Ferâhzâr

G 
 
114. Gamz-Edâ
 
115. Gazâl
 
116. Gerdâniye
 
117. Gerdâniye-Bûselik
 
118. Gerdâniye-Büzürk
 
119. Gerdâniye-Hicâz
 
120. Gerdâniye-Hüseynî
 
121. Gerdâniye-Irak
 
122. Gerdâniye-Isfahân
 
123. Gerdâniye-Kûçek
 
124. Gerdâniye-Kürdî
 
125. Gerdâniye-Nevâ
 
126. Gerdâniye-Nigâr
 
127. Gerdâniye-Nikrîzi
 
128. Gerdâniye-Rast
 
129. Gerdâniye-Rehâvî
 
130. Gerdâniye-Uşşâk
 
131. Gerdâniye-Zirgüle
 
132. Geveyşt
 
133. Geveyşt-Bûselik
 
134. Geveyşt-Büzürk
 
135. Geveyşt-Gerdâniye
 
136. Geveyşt-Hicâz
 
137. Geveyşt-Hüseynî
 
138. Geveyşt-Irak
 
139. Geveyşt-Isfahân
 
140. Geveyşt-Kûçek
 
141. Geveyşt-Nevâ
 
142. Geveyşt-Rehâvî
 
143. Geveyşt-Uşşâk
 
144. Geveyşt-Zirgüle
 
145. Gonca-i-Rânâ
 
146. Gururî
 
147. Gül-Ruh
 
148. Güldeste
 
149. Gülistân
 
150. Gülizâr
 
151. Gülnâri
 
152. Gülzâr
 
153. Gülşen-i Vefâ

H 
 
154. Hadrâ (Hazrâ)
 
155. Harran

156. Hâver
 
157. Hayâl-i Murâd
 
158. Hayân
 
159. Hazân
 
160. Heftgâh
 
161. Hicâz
 
162. Hicâz Aşirân
 
163. Hicâz-Acem
 
164. Hicâz-Bûselik
 
165. Hicâz-Büzürk
 
166. Hicâz-Gerdâniye
 
167. Hicâz-Geveyşt
 
168. Hicâz-Irak
 
169. Hicâz-Mâye
 
170. Hicâz-Nevrûz
 
171. Hicâz-Selmek
 
172. Hicâz-ı Muhâlif
 
173. Hicâz-ı Reke
 
174. Hicâz-ı Türkî
 
175. Hicâz-ı-Hicâz
 
176. Hicâz-Zemzeme
 
177. Hicâz-Şehnâz
 
178. Hicâzeyn
 
179. Hicâzî Hüseynî
 
180. Hicâzî Isfahân
 
181. Hicâzî Uşşâk
 
182. Hicâzkâr
 
183. Hicâzkâr-Bûselik
 
184. Hicâzkârı-Kürdî
 
185. Hisâr
 
186. Hisâr- Vech-i Şehnâz
 
187. Hisâr-Aşîrân
 
188. Hisâr-Bûselik
 
189. Hisâr-Evc
 
190. Hisâr-ı Büzürk
 
191. Hisâr-ı Gayr-ı Müstear
 
192. Hisâr-ı Kâdim
 
193. Hisâr-ı Kürdî
 
194. Hisâr-ı Nîk
 
195. Hisârek
 
196. Hocest
 
197. Horasan

198. Hoş-Serâ
 
199. Hucet
 
200. Hudavendigâr
 
201. Hufte-Isfahân
 
202. Hûzi
 
203. Huzî-Aşîrân
 
204. Hûzi-Bûselik
 
205. Hümâyûn
 
206. Hüseynî
 
207. Hüseynî- Geveyşt
 
208. Hüseynî-Acem
 
209. Hüseynî-Aşîrân
 
210. Hüseynî-Bûselik
 
211. Hüseynî-Gerdâniye
 
212. Hüseynî-Horasâni
 
213. Hüseynî-Kürdî (Zemzeme)
 
214. Hüseynî-Nevrûz
 
215. Hüseynî-Nikrîz
 
216. Hüseynî-Rehâvi
 
217. Hüseynî-Sabâ
 
218. Hüseynî-Şehnâz
 
219. Hüsn-ü Ân
 
220. Hüzzâm
 
221. Hüzzâm-ı Cedîd
 
222. Hüzzâm-ı Kadîm
 
223. Hüzzâm-ı Rûmi

I 
 
224. Irak
 
225. Irak-Geceyşt
 
226. Irak-Gerdâniye
 
227. Irak-Mâye
 
228. Irak-Nevrûz
 
229. Irak-Selmek
 
230. Irak-Şehnâz
 
231. Irakı Acem
 
232. Isfahân
 
233. Isfahân-Bûselik
 
234. Isfahân-Gerdâniye
 
235. Isfahân-Geveyşt
 
236. Isfahân-Irak
 
237. Isfahân-Mâye
 
238. Isfahân-Nevrûz
 
239. Isfahân-Selmek
 
240. Ifahân-ı Cedîd
 
241. Isfahân-ı Sultâni
 
242. Isfahân-Zemzeme
 
243. Isfahân-Şehnâz
 
244. Isfahânek-i Atîyk
 
245. Isfahânek-i Cedîd
 
246. Isfahânek

J

K 
 
247. Kâbilî
 
248. Karcığar
 
249. Kebûter
 
250. Kûçek
 
251. Kûçek-Geveyşt
 
252. Kûçek-Mâye
 
253. Kûçek-Nevrûz
 
254. Kûçek-Selmek
 
255. Kûçek-Sümbüle
 
256. Kûçek-Zemzeme
 
257. Kûçek-Şehnâz
 
258. Kürdî
 
259. Kürdî-Aşîrân
 
260. Kürdîli Çârgâh
 
261. Kürdîli Hicâzkâr
 
262. Kürdîli Hümâyûn

L 
 
263. Lâle-Gül
 
264. Lâle-Rûh

M 
 
265. Mâhûr
 
266. Mâhûr-Aşîrân
 
267. Mâhûr-Bûselik
 
268. Mâhûr-Hân

269. Mâhûr-i Kebîr
 
270. Mâhûr-i Kebîr-i Kadîm
 
271. Mâhûr-i Sagîyr
 
272. Mâhûrek (Mâhûr-i Sagîyr)
 
273. Mâhûri
 
274. Matlûb
 
275. Matlûbek
 
276. Mâverâünnehr
 
277. Mâye
 
278. Mâye-Bûselik
 
279. Mâye-Büzürk
 
280. Mâye-Hicâz
 
281. Mâye-Hüseynî
 
282. Mâye-i Atîyk
 
283. Mâye-i Kebîr
 
284. Mâye-i Kevser
 
285. Mâye-Irak
 
286. Mâye-Isfahân
 
287. Mâye-Kûçek
 
288. Mâye-Nevâ
 
289. Mâye-Rast (Rast-Mâye)
 
290. Mâye-Rehâvî
 
291. Mâye-Uşşâk
 
292. Mâye-Zirgüle
 
293. Mâşûk
 
294. Meclis-Efrûz

295. Mellâhi
 
296. Mezmîm
 
297. Mihr-i Cân
 
298. Muhâlif
 
299. Muhâlif-i Irak
 
300. Muhâlif-i Rast
 
301. Muhâlifek
 
302. Muhayyer
 
303. Muhayyer Bûselik
 
304. Muhayyer Irak
 
305. Muhayyer Kürdî
 
306. Muhayyer Segâh
 
307. Muhayyer Sümbüle
 
308. Muhayyer Zirgüle
 
309. Muhayyer-Zîrkeş
 
310. Mûtedil
 
311. Mûtrıbân
 
312. Mûvafık
 
313. Müberkâa
 
314. Mücenebûr-Remel
 
315. Müjdegâni
 
316. Mürgâk
 
317. Müsteâr
 
318. Müsteârek
 
319. Müteaddi
 
320. Müşküye (Segâh-Aşîrân)

N 
 
321. Na-Murâd
 
322. Nağme-i Kâbil
 
323. Nâz
 
324. Nâz-u Niyaz
 
325. Nâzenin
 
326. Necd-i Hüseynî
 
327. Nesîm

328. Nev-Edâ
 
329. Nev-Eser
 
330. Nev-Resîde
 
331. Nevâ
 
332. Nevâ-Acem
 
333. Nevâ-Aşîrân
 
334. Nevâ-Bûselik
 
335. Nevâ-Gerdâniye
 
336. Nevâ-Geveyşt
 
337. Nevâ-Hüseynî
 
338. Nevâ-Kürdî
 
339. Nevâ-Mâye
 
340. Nevâ-Nevrûz
 
341. Nevâ-Selmek
 
342. Nevâ-Şehnâz
 
343. Nevây-ı Uşşâk
 
344. Nevâziş
 
345. Nevbahâr
 
346. Nevrûz
 
347. Nevrûz-Bayâti
 
348. Nevrûz-Bûselik

349. Nevrûz-Büzürk
 
350. Nevrûz-Hicâz
 
351. Nevrûz-Hüseynî
 
352. Nevrûz-i Acem
 
353. Nevrûz-i Arâb
 
354. Nevrûz-i Hârâ
 
355. Nevrûz-i Rast
 
356. Nevrûz-i Rûmî
 
357. Nevrûz-i Sultâni
 
358. Nevrûz-Irak
 
359. Nevrûz-Isfahân
 
360. Nevrûz-Kûçek
 
361. Nevrûz-Nevâ
 
362. Nevrûz-Rehâvî
 
363. Nevrûz-Sabâ
 
364. Nevrûz-Uşşâk
 
365. Nevrûz-Zirgüle
 
366. Neşât-Âver
 
367. Nigâr

368. Nigâr-ı Nîk
 
369. Nigâr-ı Nîk-Acem
 
370. Nigârçek
 
371. Nigârek
 
372. Nihâvend
 
373. Nihâvendi Cedîd
 
374. Nihâvendi Kebir
 
375. Nihâvendi Rûmî
 
376. Nihâvendi Sagîyr
 
377. Nikrîz
 
378. Nikrîz-i Kebir
 
379. Nikrîz-i Sagîyr
 
380. Nikrîz-Segâh
 
381. Nişâbûr (Nişâpûr)
 
382. Nişâbûrek

383. Nühüft (Nihift)
 
384. Nühüft-Hicâzî
 
385. Nühüft-i Kâdîm

O

P 
 
386. Pay-Zen-i Sabâ
 
387. Pençgâh

388. Pençgâh-ı Aşl
 
389. Pençgâh-ı Zâid (Zâide)
 
390. Perzerîn
 
391. Pesendîde
 
392. Pûşegân

Q

R 
393. Râh-i Gül

394. Râh-i Hâr-Ken

395. Râh-i Hâr-Keş
 
396. Râh-i Hûsrevâni
 
397. Râh-i Rûh
 
398. Râh-i Şeb-Diz
 
399. Rahat-Fezâ
 
400. Rahâtül-Ervâh
 
401. Râmiş-Huvar
 
402. Râmiş-i Cân
 
403. Rast
 
404. Rast-Acem
 
405. Rast-Gerdâniye
 
406. Rast-Geveyşt
 
407. Rast-Hâverân
 
408. Rast-Kürdî
 
409. Rast-Mâhir
 
410. Rast-Mâye
 
411. Rast-Nevrûz
 
412. Rast-Selmek
 
413. Rast-ı Cedîd
 
414. Rast-ı Kebîr
 
415. Rast-Şehnâz
 
416. Rehâvî (Rehâvî)
 
417. Rehâvî-Gerdanîye
 
418. Rehâvî-Geveyşt
 
419. Rehâvî-Mâye
 
420. Rehâvî-Nevrûz
 
421. Rehâvî-Selmek
 
422. Rehâvî-Şehnâz
 
423. Rekb (Çârgâh-Rekb)
 
424. Rekb-i Nevrûz
 
425. Reng-i Dil
 
426. Revâ-Irak
 
427. Revnâk-Nümâ
 
428. Ridâyî
 
429. Rûh
 
430. Rûh-Efzâ
 
431. Rûhnevâz (Rûhnüvâz)
 
432. Rûy-i Aşîrân
 
433. Rûy-i Hicâz
 
434. Rûy-i Irak
 
435. Rıdvân

S 
 
436. Sabâ
 
437. Sabâ-Aşîrân
 
438. Sabâ-Bûselik
 
439. Sabâ-Uşşâk
 
440. Sabâ-Zemzeme
 
441. Safâ
 
442. Sâzkâr
 
443. Se-Bahr
 
444. Sebz-Ender-Sebz
 
445. Sebz-Ender-Sebz-i Hisâr
 
446. Sebz-Ender-Sebz-i Kadîm
 
447. Sebz-î Hisâr
 
448. Sebz-î Tâze
 
449. Sebzî
 
450. Segâh
 
451. Segâh-Acem
 
452. Segâh-Arabân
 
453. Segâh-Mâye (Mâye)
 
454. Segâh-Muhayyer
 
455. Selmek (Selmekî)
 
456. Selmek-Büzürk
 
457. Selmek-Hicâz
 
458. Selmek-Hüseynî
 
459. Selmek-i Kebîr
 
460. Selmek-i Sagîyr
 
461. Selmek-Irak
 
462. Selmek-Isfahân
 
463. Selmek-Kûçek
 
464. Selmek-Rast
 
465. Selmek-Rehâvî
 
466. Selmek-Zirgüle

467. Ser-Bülend
 
468. Ser-Henk
 
469. Serendâz (Seng-Endâz)
 
470. Sipihr
 
471. Sipihr-Hüseynî
 
472. Sipihr-Uşşâk
 
473. Sireng

474. Sultân-ı Bûselik

475. Sultân-ı Cedîd
 
476. Sultân-ı Nevâ
 
477. Sultân-ı Segâh

478. Sultân-ı Yegâh

479. Sultân-ı-Irak
 
480. Suz-i Dil
 
481. Suz-i Dilâra
 
482. Sûznâk (Basit Sûzinâk)
 
483. Sünbüle
 
484. Sünbüle-i Kâdîm
 
485. Sünbüle-Nihâvend
 
486. Şâd-Kâmı
 
487. Şâh
 
488. Şâhî
 
489. Şâhvâr (Şehvâr)
 
490. Şedd-i Arabân
 
491. Şehnâz

492. Şehnâz-Aşîrân
 
493. Şehnâz-Bûselik
 
494. Şehnâz-Büzürk
 
495. Şehnâz-Hâverân (Irak)
 
496. Şehnâz-Hicâz
 
497. Şehnâz-Hüseynî
 
498. Şehnâz-Kûçek

499. Şehnâz-Kürdî
 
500. Şehnâz-Nevâ

501. Şehnâz-Rast

502. Şehnâz-Rehâvî
 
503. Şehnâz-Uşşâk
 
504. Şehnâz-Zirgüle
 
505. Şehr-i Naz (Şehr-Nâz)
 
506. Şehvâr

507. Şems-Efrûz
 
508. Şeref-Nümâ

509. Şevk-Âver
 
510. Şevk-Efzâ

511. Şevk-Engîz
 
512. Şevk-i Cedîd
 
513. Şevk-i Dil

514. Şevk-i Serâb
 
515. Şevk-i Tarâb
 
516. Şeşgâh
 
517. Şiâr
 
518. Şinâver
 
519. Şirâz
 
520. Şirâz-Sünbüle
 
521. Şirîn
 
522. Şîvekâr
 
523. Şîvekeş
 
524. Şîvenümâ
 
525. Şûrî
 
526. Şüster

T 
 
527. Tâhir
 
528. Tâhir-Bûselik
 
529. Tâhir-i Kebîr
 
530. Tâhir-i Sagîyr
 
531. Tâhir-Kürdî
 
532. Tanık
 
533. Tarz-ı Bihîn
 
534. Tarz-ı Cedîd
 
535. Tarz-ı Nevîn
 
536. Tebrîz
 
537. Tehrîzî
 
538. Tereşşüd
 
539. Terkîb-i Sabâ
 
540. Tüvânger

U 
 
541. Urfa-Mâhûr
 
542. Uzzâl
 
543. Uzzâl-Acem
 
544. Uzzâl-Hüseynî
 
545. Uzzâl-Şehnâz
 
546. Uşşâk
 
547. Uşşâk-Aşîrân
 
548. Uşşâk-Gerdâniye
 
549. Uşşâk-Geveyşt
 
550. Uşşâk-Mâye
 
551. Uşşâk-Nevrûz
 
552. Uşşâk-Selmek
 
553. Uşşâk-Şehnâz

V 
 
554. Vâmık
 
555. Vech-i Arazbâr
 
556. Vech-i Bûselik
 
557. Vech-i Hüseynî
 
558. Vech-i Şehnâz

X

Y 
 
559. Yâr
 
560. Yegâh

Z 
 
561. Zâd-ı Dil
 
562. Zâvîl (Zavil)
 
563. Zâvîli (Zâvûli)
 
564. Zâvîli Isfahân

565. Zâvîli Segâh
 
566. Zemzem

567. Zemzeme (Eski Zemzeme)
 
568. Zemzeme-Kürdî
 
569. Zende-Rûd

570. Zengüle (Zirgüle)
 
571. Zengüle-Bûselik
 
572. Zengüle-Gerdâniye
 
573. Zengüle-Geveyşt
 
574. Zengüle-Mâye
 
575. Zengüle-Nevrûz
 
576. Zengüle-Selmek
 
577. Zengüle-Şehnâz
 
578. Zengüleli Sûznak
 
579. Zevk-Bahş
 
580. Zevk-i Dil
 
581. Zevk-u Tarâb
 
582. Zirefkend
 
583. Zirefkend Şarkı
 
584. Zirefkend-i Büzürk
 
585. Zirefkend-i Kûçek
 
586. Zirefkend-i Rûmi
 
587. Zirkeş-Hâveran
 
588. Zirkeş-Hüseynî
 
589. Zirkeşîde

590. Zülf-i Nigâr

Turkish music
Music theory lists
Modes (music)

Ottoman classical music
Turkish makam music